Karl Scharnweber (born 1950) in Rostock is a German church musician, Jazz musician and composer.

Life 

After his school years in Rostock, Scharnweber began studying church music at the Evangelische Hochschule für Kirchenmusik Halle in 1969. From 1973, he worked as a church musician in various churches in Mecklenburg. In addition to this task, which he held part-time at the inner city parish of Rostock from 1997 to 2016, he devotes himself to composing and performing new arrangements on various theological texts. As early as the 1970s, Scharnweber worked with the Weber Trio to perform his own jazz compositions.

The works reach beyond church music and also deal with historical and contemporary critical themes. Scharnweber is co-founder of the association Canticum novum, which supports Reinmuth's and Scharnweber's work and enables a continuous work.

Numerous concert tours have taken Scharnweber to various countries in Europe and the US. In June 2013 he received the Kulturpreis der Hansestadt Rostock.

References

External links 
 
 

20th-century classical composers
1950 births
Living people
People from Rostock
20th-century jazz composers